The Quadra was a survey and patrol vessel operated by the Dominion of Canada.  She was launched in 1891, on the River Cart, in Scotland.  For her first fourteen years her captain was John T. Walbran.

The Quadra undertook surveys, maintained buoys and lighthouses, carried Police, and carried the Governor General on a visit to Alaska.

The Quadra foundered in 1906 in Nanaimo Harbour,  and was raised in 1916.

References

Dominion Government Ships
1891 ships